Igor Gavrilin may refer to:
 Igor Gavrilin (rugby league) (b. 1971), Russian rugby league player
 Igor Gavrilin (footballer) (b. 1972), Russian footballer